Ōyama-tsumi or Ohoyama-tsumi (Kojiki:  or Nihon Shoki: ,), also Ōyama-tsumi-mi'oya-no-mikoto, is a god of mountains, sea, and war in Japanese mythology. He is an elder brother of Amaterasu and Susanoo. His other names are Watashi-no-Ōkami and Sakatoke.

Genealogy 
In the Kamiumi of the Kojiki, Ōyama-tsumi was born between Izanagi and Izanami. After which he gave birth with Kaya-no-hime (鹿屋野比売神), also known as No-zuchi (野椎神), female deity from their union, the following gods pairs of eight were born:

 Ame-no-sazuchi (天之狭土神), genderless deity and spirit
 Kuni-no-sazuchi (国之狭土神), genderless deity and spirit
 Ame-no-sagiri (天之狭霧神), genderless deity and spirit
 Kuni-no-sagiri (国之狭霧神), genderless deity and spirit
 Ame-no-kurado (天之闇戸神), genderless deity and spirit
 Kuni-no-kurado (国之闇戸神), genderless deity and spirit
 Ohoto-mato-hiko (大戸惑子神), male deity
 Ohoto-mato-hime (大戸惑女神), female deity

Other children of Ōyama-tsumi who are parentless without a mother:

 Kamu'ō-ichi-hime (神大市比売), her children: 

 Ōtoshi (大歳神, Ōtoshi-no-kami) or Nigihayahi (饒速日尊 Nigihayahi-no-mikoto), commonly known: Toshigami (年神) or Ōtoshi (大年神, Ōtoshi-no-kami)
 Uka-no-mitama (宇迦之御魂神, Uka-no-mitama-no-kami), commonly known as Inari (稲荷神, Inari-no-kami)

 Ko-no-hana-chiru-hime (木花知流比売) - wife of Yashimajinumi (八島士奴美神), his nephew through Susanoo
 Iwanaga-hime (石長比売) or (磐長姫命 in the Kujiki (旧事紀), or Sendai Kuji Hongi (先代旧事本紀)) - sister of Ko-no-sakuya-hime and wife of Ninigi
 Ko-no-sakuya-hime (木花之佐久夜毘売) - sister of Iwanaga-hime and wife of Ninigi

including the twin deities:

 Ashinazuchi or Ashinadzuchi (Kojiki: 足名椎; Nihon Shoki: 脚摩乳命) - other names: (足摩乳命, 足名槌命 Ashinazuchi or Ashinadzuchi -no-mikoto; 足名鉄神, Ashinazuchi or Ashinadzuchi)
 Tenazuchi or Tenadzuchi (Kojiki: 手名椎; Nihon Shoki: 手摩乳命) - other name: (名槌命, Tenazuchi or Tenadzuchi)

However, in the Nihon Shoki, Ōyama-tsumi is supposed to be born when Izanagi slashed his child, Kagutsuchi (軻遇突智).

The child of Ōyama-tsumi from his first wife Kaya-no-hime, the deity Ame-no-sagiri has a daughter, Tohotsumachi-ne (遠津待根神), and the eighth descendant of the male deity Ōkuninushi (大国主神), the male deity Ame-no-hibara-ōshinadomi (天日腹大科度美神), from their union gave birth to the male deity, To'otsuyama-sakitarashi (遠津山岬多良斯神), who is the descendant of Ōyama-tsumi.

There is not much written about Ōyama-tsumi, and children associated with him appears at times. As for the myth of Yamata-no-orochi, Susanoo's wife, Kushinada-hime (櫛名田比売命 Kushinada-hime-no-mikoto), and her twin parents, the male deity Ashinazuchi (足名椎) and female deity Tenazuchi (手名椎), are known and claimed to be the children of Ōyama-tsumi.

Afterwards, the lineage falls together with his descendants of his half-brother Susanoo, with the union of Ōyama-tsumi first daughter, Kamu'ō-ichi-hime (神大市比売), between them gave birth to Ōtoshi (or Toshigami) and Uka-no-mitama. Then, Susanoo's union with Ōyama-tsumi granddaughter, Kushinada-hime, gave birth to the male deity Yashimajinumi (八島士奴美神). Then Yashimajinumi married Ōyama-tsumi's daughter Konohachiru-hime (木花知流比売), from their union gave birth to the male deity Fuwanomojikunusunu/ Fuwanomodjikunusunu (布波能母遅久奴須奴神, or Fuhanomojikunusunu/ Fuhanomodjikunusunu). Fuwanomojikunusu is the husband of Hikawa-hime (日河比売, or Hikaha-hime), the daughter of the male deity Okami (淤加美神), from their union gave birth to the male deity Fukafuchi-no-Mizuyarehana (深淵之水夜礼花神). 

Then, Fukafuchi-no-Mizuyarehana married Ame-no-tsudohechine (天之都度閇知泥神, or 阿麻乃都刀閇乃知尼, Ama-no-tsutohenochine in the "Origin of the Great Shining Deity Awaga" (Awaga Daimyōjin Mototsufumi, 粟鹿大明神元記)) and from their union gave birth to Omizunu/ Omidzunu (淤美豆奴神, or 意弥都奴). Then, Omizunu/ Omidzunu married the female deity Futemimi (布帝耳神), who is the daughter of the deity Funozuno (布怒豆怒神) and from their union gave birth to the male deity Ame-no-Fuyukinu (天之冬衣神). Ame-no-Fuyukinu married the female deity Sashikuniwaka-hime (刺国若比売), who is the daughter of the male deity Sashikuni (刺国大神, Sashikuni Ōkami), from their union gave birth to the male deity Ōkuninushi, the sixth generation grandson of Ōyama-tsumi. These are recorded from a book called the "Origin of the Great Shining Deity Awaga" (Awaga Daimyōjin Mototsufumi, 粟鹿大明神元記) at Awaga Shrine (粟鹿神社, Awaga Jinja) in Awaga, town of Santō, Asago, Hyōgo Prefecture, Japan.

In the myth of Tenson Kōrin (天孫降臨), the descent of Amaterasu's grandson Ninigi-no-Mikoto from Heaven (Takamagahara) to Ashihara no Nakatsukuni, Ninigi has encountered Ōyama-tsumi's daughter Ko-no-hanasakuya-hime (木花之佐久夜毘売), - the kami of Mount Fuji, Ōyama-tsumi has offered both Ko-no-hanasakuya-hime and her older sister Iwanaga-hime (石長比売). Then, when Ninigi sends back Iwanaga-hime only by her ugly appearance, which in return has angered Ōyama-tsumi and said, "The reason why I gave together with Iwanaga-hime aside from her sibling Ko-no-hanasakuya-hime was because I made a pledge that the heavenly grandson (Ninigi) would be eternal like a rock, but she was sent back and the life expectancy of the heavenly grandson (Ninigi) was shortened."

His most important shrine, Ōyamazumi Shrine, is located on Ōmishima.

References

Japanese gods
Mountain gods
Sea and river gods
Shinto kami
War gods
Kunitsukami

